Clarence Leon "Brick" Mitchell (c. 1894 – October 21, 1963) was an American football player and coach. He served as the head football coach at the University of Nevada, Reno from 1932 to 1935, compiling a record of 10–20–3. Mitchell played college football as the University of Oregon from 1915 to 1918.  He was selected to the 1916 All-Pacific Coast football team as an end.  Before he was hired at Nevada, Mitchell worked as a line coach under Nibs Price at the University of California, Berkeley.  Mitchell coached football at San Mateo High School in San Mateo, California in the 1920s and led them to a state championship in 1926.  In 1958, he was teaching mechanical drawing at Oroville High School in Oroville, California.  Mitchell died on October 21, 1963, at the University of California Hospital in San Francisco.

Head coaching record

College

References

1890s births
1963 deaths
Year of birth uncertain

American football ends
High school football coaches in California
Nevada Wolf Pack football coaches
Oregon Ducks football players